Kwadwo Amoako (born 12 December 1998) is a Ghanaian professional footballer who plays as defender for Ghanaian Premier League side Ashanti Gold S.C.

Club career 
Amoako started his career with Techiman Eleven Wonders FC, he played for the club in the 2019 GFA Normalization Committee Special Competition. He moved to Ashanti Gold in 2019, ahead of the 2019–20 Ghana Premier League season.

International career 
In November 2020, Amoako got his first call up to the Ghana national football team for the 2021 Africa Cup of Nations qualifications double header match against the Sudan national football team.

References

External links 
 
 

Living people
1998 births
Association football defenders
Ghanaian footballers
Ashanti Gold SC players
Ghana Premier League players
Techiman Eleven Wonders FC players